Saint-Pierre-Église is a commune in the Manche department in Normandy in north-western France.

A market takes place in Saint-Pierre-Église every Wednesday.

International relations

Saint-Pierre-Église is twinned with Twyford, United Kingdom.

See also
Communes of the Manche department

References

Saintpierreeglise